Rui Miguel Leal das Neves (born 21 December 1969) is a former Portuguese football player.

Club career
He made his professional debut in the Primeira Liga for Estrela da Amadora on 9 October 1988 as a starter in a 0–2 loss to Boavista. He spent the most of his career with the club, playing 318 games on the top flight of Portuguese football.

Personal life
His twin brother Jorge Neves also played football professionally, winning the Portuguese Cup with Beira-Mar and is now a coach.

References

1969 births
Footballers from Lisbon
Twin sportspeople
Living people
Portuguese footballers
Association football defenders
C.F. Estrela da Amadora players
Primeira Liga players
Liga Portugal 2 players
Gil Vicente F.C. players